Patricia Berghult Svensson (born 2 May 1994) is a Swedish professional boxer who has held the WBC female super-welterweight title since November 2021. As of April 2020, she is ranked as the world's sixth best active female super-welterweight by BoxRec.

Professional career
Berghult made her professional debut on 18 December 2015, scoring a four round unanimous decision victory over Sara Marjanovic at the Rosvalla Arena in Nyköping, Sweden.

After compiling a record of 13–0 (3 KO), Berghult challenged IBO super-welterweight champion Hannah Rankin on 27 November 2019 at the Hotel Intercontinental in St. Julian's, Malta, with the vacant WBC interim title also on the line. In a fight that saw Rankin suffer a knockdown from a left hook in the first-round, Berghult won via unanimous decision over ten rounds, with the judges scoring the bout 96–93, 95–94 and 94–93.

Professional boxing record

References

Living people
1994 births
Sportspeople from Malmö
Swedish women boxers
Light-middleweight boxers
International Boxing Organization champions